is a town in Kagawa Prefecture, Japan, with a population of 13,646. The town was established in 2006 and covers various ports and communities on the eastern half of Shōdoshima, the second-largest island in the Seto Inland Sea. Shōdoshima is roughly halfway between the much larger islands of Shikoku to the south and Honshu to the north, and has a mild and relatively dry climate.

Soy sauce production, which flourished through the early 20th century, remains a major industry. Other industries include sōmen noodles, tsukudani (made with soy sauce), fishing and agriculture. In Japan, olives were first successfully cultivated here in the 1910s and olive oil production resurged in the late 20th century.

Tourism is also economically important. Shodoshima participates in the Setouchi Triennale, a regional art festival, and the mountainous interior is home to Kankakei Gorge. The book and film Twenty-Four Eyes was set on the island, and a movie studio park and museum attracts visitors.

Geography

Climate
Shōdoshima has a humid subtropical climate (Köppen climate classification Cfa) with hot, humid summers, and cool winters. Some rain falls throughout the year, but the months from May to September have the heaviest rain.

Demographics
Per Japanese census data, the population of Shōdoshima in 2020 is 13,870 people. Shōdoshima has been conducting censuses since 1920.

Notable locations 
The town of Shōdoshima was created in 2006 by merging the former towns of Ikeda and Uchinomi, both from Shōzu District. The total area is 95.59 km², and covers the entire eastern half of the island of Shōdoshima. Notable communities and locations include:

 Kankakei Gorge
 Sakate, a port in the southeast
 Kusakabe, a port and community, with soy sauce production concentrated to the east
 Olive Park/Olive Garden, olive orchards and tourist sites
 Twenty-Four Eyes Movie Studio, a tourist site for the book and film Twenty-Four Eyes

References

External links
  

Towns in Kagawa Prefecture